The 2008 NASCAR Canadian Tire Series was an exciting season of racing and the second season of the series.  Scott Steckly, who dominated many events He won three of the first four events of the year fought off a late season charge from Thomson Jr. to become the series second ever champion winning by a margin of 24 points. British Columbia native Jason White was the rookie of the year beating Anthony Simone. Past CASCAR champion Peter Gibbons decided to retire after a lengthy career.

Schedule

Results 

 – Set by owners points

Final standings

The top 10

See also
2008 NASCAR Sprint Cup Series
2008 NASCAR Nationwide Series
2008 NASCAR Craftsman Truck Series
2008 NASCAR Camping World East Series
2008 NASCAR Camping World West Series
2008 NASCAR Corona Series

References
 Official Website

External links
Canadian Tire Series Standings and Statistics for 2008

NASCAR Canadian Tire Series season 

NASCAR Pinty's Series